Panachaiki railway station is a railway station in Patras in the northwestern Peloponnese, Greece. The station is located in the city, close to Pampeloponnisiako Stadium, on Piraeus–Patras line and is severed by Proastiakos Patras Services. Pending the completion of the Athens Airport–Patras railway, it will be connected to Aigio, Diakopto and Kiato, where connecting train services to Athens Airport and Piraeus (via Athens central railway station) are available.

History
From 29 February 2020, service was suspended due to the coronavirus pandemic, becoming the starting point of the new Line 2 of the Suburban Railway to the town of Kato Achaia.

In November 2022, TERNA-MYTILINEOS, the contractor of the project to complete the final phase of Athens Airport–Patras railway was charged with undertaking the electrification project in the previous section, from Kiato to Aegio. With the electric train, the distance on the Athens-Kiato-Rio axis will be covered in less than two hours with an intercity express.

Facilities
The station currently is little more than a halt, with a single platform. The station, however lays close to Pampeloponnisiako Stadium, home of Panachaiki F.C..

Services
The station is served by the Agios Andreas–Rio line of the Proastiakos. Rail services are provided by OSE trains (Stadler GTW 2/6 diesel two-car units). The trains run every hour daily, from 6:23 in the morning until 23:23 in the evening. The Agios Andreas–Rio route has two bus connections at Kastellokampos—to Agios Vasileios and the General University Hospital of Patras via the University of Patras.

Several local bus lines of Patras pass through the station.

References

External links
Οργανισμός Σιδηροδρόμων Ελλάδος (ΟΣΕ) - GTP

Buildings and structures in Patras
Railway stations in Achaea
Railway stations opened in 1954
1954 establishments in Greece
Transport in Patras